Cademia Siciliana (Sicilian Academy) is a transnational non-profit organization founded in 2016 by a group of Sicilian language academics, activists, researchers, and students with the mission to promote the Sicilian language through education, research, and activism. The organization has published an orthographical proposal for the Sicilian language, and maintains several Sicilian language research and technology projects. Including translation and language advocacy projects for several popular applications and platforms such as Firefox, Telegram, Facebook and Android Keyboard. In 2021 the group gained attention for their collaboration with Google's Woolaroo, an augmented reality project intended to support regional and minority languages.

In May 2018 in order to prepare for the beginning of teaching of Sicilian culture and language in the schools in Sicily the organisation began providing workshops and materials for schools. These programmes aim to increase awareness regarding glottophobia, sociolinguistics, and to promote literacy in Sicilian.

In 2018 and 2019 the organization published an edition in Sicilian of the UNESCO Courier, along with a podcast audio companion to help promote literacy in the language.

Publications

Books

Periodicals

Other works 
 Grazzi, translation into  of

See also 
Sicily
Sicilian language
Gallo-Italic of Sicily
Siculo-Arabic
Center for Sicilian Philological and Linguistic Studies

Notes and references 

Sicilian language
Language advocacy organizations
2016 establishments in Italy